Mohammad-Esmail Nazari (born September 20, 1987) is an Iranian football player.

Club career
A product of the PAS Tehran's youth system, Esmail Nazari was drafted into the first team for the IPL 2006/07 season. At the end of the season as PAS F.C. officially dissolved, he moved to PAS Hamedan along with other team members.

Club Career Statistics
Last Update  11 June 2019 

 Assist Goals

External links
Persian League Profile

International career
Mohammad Esmail Nazar was a member of Iran national under-23 football team, competing in the qualification games for the 2008 Summer Olympics.

1987 births
Living people
Iranian footballers
Steel Azin F.C. players
Pas players
Expatriate footballers in Thailand
Expatriate footballers in Oman
Association football midfielders
Iranian expatriate sportspeople in Thailand
Iranian expatriate footballers